A list of films produced in the Soviet Union in 1954 (see also 1954 in film).

1954

See also
 1954 in the Soviet Union

External links
 Soviet films of 1954 at the Internet Movie Database

1954
Soviet
Films